Blumfield can refer to:

 Blumfield Township, Michigan (and Blumfield Corners) in Michigan
 Garrard & Blumfield, an English electric car manufactured from 1894 to 1896
 Caroline Blumfield, an English Labour and Co-operative politician
 Justin Blumfield, a former Australian rules football player